Turretot is a commune in the Seine-Maritime department in the Normandy region in northern France.

Geography

Population

Places of interest
 The church of St. Anne, dating from the thirteenth century.
 The church of St. Martin, dating from the twelfth century.

See also
Communes of the Seine-Maritime department

References

External links

Website of the Sporting Club de Turretot 

Communes of Seine-Maritime